The 2022 District of Columbia Attorney General election was held on November 8, 2022, to elect the next attorney general for the District of Columbia. This was the third attorney general election in D.C. history. 

Incumbent attorney general Karl Racine had declined to run for reelection.

Democratic primary
A Democratic primary will be held on June 21, 2022. Incumbent attorney general Karl Racine was considered likely to run for mayor or reelection as attorney general and even filed paperwork in 2020, but announced he would not run for any office in October 2021. 

According to District election law, an candidate for Attorney General must have been actively engaged as an attorney in the District for at least five of the previous ten years. In late March 2022, candidate Bruce Spiva filed a challenge with the Board of Elections in which he claimed frontrunner Kenyan McDuffie was ineligible to run for the position. The challenge said that McDuffie did not spend at least five of the previous ten years actively engaged as an attorney. McDuffie responded, saying he is an attorney and that his work as a Councilmember since 2012 should count toward the requirement. On April 18, the Board of Elections upheld Spiva's challenge, and it ruled that McDuffie was ineligible to run for the office. McDuffie requested a rehearing, but the D.C. Court of Appeals denied his request.

Candidates

Declared
 Ryan Jones, attorney from Brightwood
Brian Schwalb, attorney from Chevy Chase
 Bruce Spiva, attorney from Crestwood

Disqualified
 Kenyan McDuffie, Councilmember for Ward 5 (2012-present)

Declined
 Karl Racine, incumbent Attorney General for the District of Columbia (since 2015)

Endorsements

Debates and forums

Results

General election

References

External links
Official campaign websites
 Ryan Jones (D) for Attorney General
 Kenyan McDuffie (D) for Attorney General
 Brian Schwalb (D) for Attorney General
 Bruce Spiva (D) for Attorney General

Attorney General
Attorney General 2022
District of Columbia